Virley is a village and civil parish in the Colchester borough of Essex, England and forms part of the Winstred Hundred grouped parish council. According to the 2001 census it had a population of 61. The village is about seven miles south of Colchester.

Virley is among the villages which suffered damage from the 1884 Colchester earthquake; the village church of St Mary's was largely  destroyed in the quake, though some ruins remain.

External links

 1884 earthquake

References

Villages in Essex
Civil parishes in Essex
Borough of Colchester